The  is a half-track motorcycle with a single front wheel, better known as the , shortened to  (pl. ). It was used by the military of Nazi Germany during the Second World War.

Design
The  started its life as a light tractor for airborne troops. The vehicle was designed to be delivered by Junkers Ju 52 aircraft, though not by parachute. The vehicle had the advantage of being the only gun tractor small enough to fit inside the hold of the Ju 52, and was the lightest mass-produced German military vehicle to use the complex  overlapped and interleaved road wheels used on almost all German military half-tracked vehicles of World War II.

A motion of the handlebars beyond that point would engage the track brakes to help make turns sharper. It was also possible to run the vehicle without the front wheel installed and this was recommended in extreme off-road conditions where speed would be kept low.

Patented in June 1939, it was first used in the invasion of the Soviet Union in 1941. Later in the war  from  also produced s under license, accounting for about 10% of the total production.

The  came with a special trailer Sonderanhänger 1 (Sd.Anh.1) that could be attached to it to improve its cargo capacity. The trailer carried .

Being a tracked vehicle, the  could climb up to 24° in sand and even more on hard ground.

Service

Most  saw service on the Eastern Front, where they were used to lay communication cables, pull heavy loads and carry soldiers through the deep Russian mud. Later in the war,  were used as runway tugs for aircraft, especially for the Messerschmitt Me 262 jet fighter, and sometimes the Arado Ar 234 jet reconnaissance-bomber. In order to save aviation fuel, German jet aircraft were towed to the runway, rather than taxiing under their own power.

The vehicle was also used in the North African theater and on the Western Front.

Variants
Production of the vehicle was stopped in 1944, at which time 8,345 had been built. After the war, production resumed at NSU. Around 550  were built for agricultural use, with production ending in 1948 (some sources say 1949).

See also

 Springer (vehicle), a one-use military demolition vehicle based on the s powertrain.
 List of Sd.Kfz. designations

References

External links

 
 
 
 

World War II military vehicles of Germany
World War II half-tracks
Half-tracks of Germany
Military vehicles introduced from 1940 to 1944